Cardinal de Talleyrand-Périgord can refer to the following French cardinals:

 Hélie de Talleyrand-Périgord (cardinal) (1301-1364)
 Alexandre Angélique de Talleyrand-Périgord (1736-1821)